Ogulin-Plaški valley is a valley in the mountainous part of central Croatia, named after the towns of Ogulin and Plaški. It is located at an elevation of 300 to 380 meters above sea level, surrounded by the Dinaric Alps, namely the mountains of Velika Kapela, Mala Kapela, Krpelj, Radošić, Brezovica, Hum, and Pištenik.

The two namesakes of the valley also include karst fields or polje, those of Ogulin and of Plaški.

The A1 motorway intersects the valley near Oštarije. The D42 road and the M604 railway pass through it longitudinally.

References

Plains of Croatia
Landforms of Karlovac County